The following lists events that happened during 1964 in Australia.

Incumbents

 Monarch – Elizabeth II
 Governor-General – Viscount De L'Isle
 Prime Minister – Sir Robert Menzies
 Opposition Leader – Arthur Calwell
 Chief Justice – Sir Owen Dixon (until 13 April), then Sir Garfield Barwick

State and Territory Leaders
 Premier of New South Wales – Bob Heffron (until 30 April), then Jack Renshaw
 Opposition Leader – Robert Askin
 Premier of Queensland – Frank Nicklin
 Opposition Leader – Jack Duggan
 Premier of South Australia – Sir Thomas Playford IV
 Opposition Leader – Frank Walsh
 Premier of Tasmania – Eric Reece
 Opposition Leader – Angus Bethune
 Premier of Victoria – Henry Bolte
 Opposition Leader – Clive Stoneham
 Premier of Western Australia – David Brand
 Opposition Leader – Albert Hawke

Governors and Administrators
 Governor of New South Wales – Lieutenant General Sir Eric Woodward
 Governor of Queensland – Colonel Sir Henry Abel Smith
 Governor of South Australia – Lieutenant General Sir Edric Bastyan
 Governor of Tasmania – General Sir Charles Gairdner
 Governor of Victoria – Major General Sir Rohan Delacombe
 Governor of Western Australia – Major General Sir Douglas Kendrew
 Administrator of Nauru –  Reginald Leydin
 Administrator of Norfolk Island – Robert Wordsworth, then Roger Nott
 Administrator of the Northern Territory –  Roger Nott (until 1 October), then Roger Dean
 Administrator of Papua and New Guinea – Sir Donald Cleland

Events
 29 January – The Royal Australian Air Force takes delivery of its first two Mirage fighter jets
 3 February – The first double-decker carriages begin trial runs on the Sydney rail network
 4 February – Cyclone Dora strikes north west Queensland
 10 February – Melbourne–Voyager collision: The aircraft carrier  and the destroyer  collide, with the loss of 82 lives
 March – There is a split in the Communist Party of Australia and the Communist Party of Australia (Marxist-Leninist) is formed
 April – The Menzies government refuses to ratify the International Labour Organization convention on equal pay for women.
 April – The editors of Sydney satirical Oz magazine – Richard Neville, Richard Walsh and Martin Sharp – are charged with printing an obscene publication
 8 April – The  Moonie oil pipeline to Lytton Oil Refinery opens
 24 April – Melbourne woman Judy Hanrahan becomes the first female teller appointed by the Bank of NSW since World War II
 27 April Sir Garfield Barwick resigns as Minister for External Affairs to take up his appointment as the new Chief Justice of the High Court of Australia
 June – Macquarie University is founded. 
 12–30 June – The Beatles' 1964 world tour in Australia and New Zealand.
 6 July – Warrant Officer Class 2, Kevin Conway of the Australian Army Training Team died; he was Australia's first Vietnam War battle casualty.
 15 July – The first edition of The Australian is published in Canberra. It is Australia's first national daily newspaper, published by Rupert Murdoch's News Limited.
 17 July – Donald Campbell sets new land speed record of 429 miles per hour in his jet-propelled car "Bluebird" at Lake Eyre, South Australia
 August – The Tasman Bridge across the Derwent River opens in Hobart.
 26 October – Notorious Perth serial killer Eric Edgar Cooke is executed at Fremantle Prison; he is the last person to be hanged in Western Australia
 10 November – Prime Minister Robert Menzies announces the reintroduction of National Service
 10 December –  The Queensland government declares a state of emergency in an attempt to end the Mount Isa Mines dispute
 16 December – Melbourne's La Trobe University is founded
 31 December – Donald Campbell sets new water speed record of 276 miles per hour at Dumbleyung Lake, Western Australia
 The Beatles tour Australia
 Sir Percy Spender is appointed President of the International Court of Justice
 Swimmer Dawn Fraser is named Australian of the Year

Science and technology
2 October – Gladesville Bridge opened – the world's longest concrete arch at the time.

Arts and literature

Donald Horne's The Lucky Country published.
Kath Walker's We Are Going published.
My Brother Jack by George Johnston is awarded the Miles Franklin Literary Award.

Television
 The launch of ATV-0 marks the birth of the third commercial television network, now known as Network Ten
 Singer Johnny Chester hosts a new ABC TV show called Teen Scene, which also features his backing group The Chessmen as the house band.
 20 October – Police drama Homicide begins a 12-year run and sets the pace for Australian television drama.
 11 November – The Mavis Bramston Show premieres on HSV 7 in Melbourne.

Sport
 17 May Bernard "Midget" Farrelly wins the first World Surfboard Championship at Manly Beach
18 July – Robert Vagg wins the men's national marathon title, clocking 2:24:06.2 in Sydney.
 Polo Prince wins the Melbourne Cup
 South Australia wins the Sheffield Shield
 Freya wins the Sydney to Hobart Yacht Race
 Australia places 8th in the 1964 Olympic Games with 6 gold medals
St. George win the 1964 NSWRFL season Grand Final, winning their ninth straight premiership after defeating Balmain 11–6. Canterbury-Bankstown finish in last position, claiming the wooden spoon.
 Melbourne Football Club wins the Victorian Football League Grand Final

Births
 15 January – Scott Emerson, politician
 16 January – Chris Dittmar, squash player
 25 January – Mark McPhee, cricketer (died 1999) 
 25 February – Dale Last, politician
 3 March – Sandy Bolton, politician
 4 March – Karen Knowles, entertainer
 13 March 
 Stephen Bennett, politician
 Trevor Gillmeister, rugby league player 
 26 March – Martin Bella, rugby league player  
 8 April – Michael Caltabiano, politician
 15 April – Lee Kernaghan, country singer/songwriter
 19 April – Peter Jackson (died 1997), Australian rugby league footballer
 30 April – Ian Healy, cricket player and commentator
 2 May – John Hathaway, politician
 19 May – Peter Jackson, rugby league player (died 1997)  
 28 May – Jeff Fenech, boxer and trainer
 3 June – Matthew Ryan, equestrian
 7 June – Gia Carides, actress
 9 June – Jane Kennedy, actress and comedian
 11 June – Carl Barron, comedian
 22 June – Tom Crebbin, Australian rules footballer  
 23 June – Tara Morice, actress, singer, and dancer
 1 July – Clayton Lamb, Australian rules footballer  
 4 July – Martin Flood, quiz show winner 
 13 July – Leanne Benjamin, ballet dancer
 3 August – Michael Healy, politician
 4 August – Andrew Bartlett, politician
 5 August – Dale Shuttleworth, politician
 10 August – Andy Caldecott, motorcycle racer (died 2006)
 14 August – Jason Dunstall, Australian Rules football player
 19 August – Dermott Brereton, Australian Rules football player
 5 September – Frank Farina, soccer player and manager
 11 September – Kathy Watt, cyclist
 16 September – Chris Franklin, comedian 
 27 October – Mark Taylor, cricket player and commentator
 28 October – Darius Perkins, actor (died 2019)
 29 October – Eddie McGuire, businessman and television presenter
 29 October – Jackie Pereira, field hockey striker
 9 November – Mark Dalton, basketball player
 19 November – Peter Rohde, footballer (Carlton F.C.) 
 23 November – Marilyn Kidd, rower
 9 December – Larry Emdur, television presenter
 16 December
 Georgie Parker, actress
 Gabrielle Upton, politician
 22 December – Sam Cox, politician

Deaths
 23 January – Claude Hulbert, British actor (born 1900)
 12 February – Arthur Upfield, author (born 1890)
 18 April – Wilfred Mibus, Victorian politician (born 1900)
 19 October – Nettie Palmer, author (born 1885)

See also
 List of Australian films of the 1960s

References

 
Australia
Years of the 20th century in Australia